A Little Lumpen Novelita (Una novelita lumpen in Spanish) is a 2002 novel by the Chilean author Roberto Bolaño. A translation from the Spanish by Natasha Wimmer was published by New Directions in September 2014.

The book is divided into sixteen short chapters, told in first person by the protagonist Bianca, who recalls her childhood, adolescence and early adulthood.

Il Futuro, a 2013 film directed by Alicia Scherson and starring Manuela Martelli and Rutger Hauer, was based on this novel.

2002 novels
Works by Roberto Bolaño
Novels set in Rome
Arnoldo Mondadori Editore books
Chilean novels adapted into films